

Max Karoubi is a French mathematician, topologist, who works on K-theory, cyclic homology and noncommutative geometry and who founded the first European Congress of Mathematics.

In 1967, he received his Ph.D. in mathematics (Doctorat d'État) from the University of Paris, under the supervision of Henri Cartan and Alexander Grothendieck.

In 1973, he was nominated full professor at the University of Paris 7-Denis Diderot until 2007. He is now an emeritus professor there.  In 2012 he became a fellow of the American Mathematical Society.

Karoubi has supervised 12 Ph.D. students, including Jean-Louis Loday and Christophe Soulé.

See also
Karoubi conjecture
Karoubi envelope

Publications

Notes

External links
Home page of Max Karoubi

20th-century French mathematicians
21st-century French mathematicians
Fellows of the American Mathematical Society
Living people
Academic staff of Paris Diderot University
University of Paris alumni
Topologists
1938 births
People from Tunis